León Cortés Castro (December 8, 1882 – March 3, 1946) was a Costa Rican politician. He served as President of Costa Rica from 1936 to 1940. During his term he introduced new bank reforms, supported banana plantations in the South Pacific region, and established ports at Quepos and Golfito. His administration is often referred to as the "iron bars and cement administration" because of the various construction projects undertaken during his presidency, including the construction of the former International Airport of La Sabana.   He was the last of a series of relatively conservative Presidents.  He considered changes to allow him to pursue re-election as President, but ultimately backed down due to a Constitutional ban on consecutive terms.  He was succeeded by Rafael Ángel Calderón Guardia, who ultimately broke with tradition and substantially increased the scope of the social state.

Previously he served as secretary of education from 1929 to 1930, and as secretary of agriculture from 1932 to 1935.

In San José province there is a canton that bears his name and, in San José, a monument to him stands in front of the Costa Rica Art Museum.

References

1882 births
1946 deaths
People from Alajuela
Presidents of Costa Rica
Vice presidents of Costa Rica
Costa Rican people of Colombian descent
20th-century Costa Rican lawyers